Loving Memory is a 1970 black and white psychological drama film written and directed by Tony Scott, credited as Anthony Scott. This 52 minute film was made 12 years before Scott's feature directorial debut, The Hunger. It was partly financed by the actor Albert Finney and the BFI Production Board, and was shown at the 1971 Cannes Film Festival.

Plot
The film concerns an elderly couple, who turn out to be a brother and sister left traumatized by the Second World War. As is also revealed, they were involved in the accidental death of a bicycle rider. Instead of reporting the accident, they bring the body home with them.

Cast
Rosamund Greenwood as Ambrose's sister
Roy Evans as Ambrose
David Pugh as Mr Speke, Young Man

Production
Of the budget, £6,500 came from Albert Finney's Memorial Enterprises, £6,000 from the BFI (only half of which came from the production board the rest being a grant from the Vivien Leigh Memorial Fund.)

Critical reception
DVD Beaver noted "a slow, meditative film that showcases Scott's ability to quietly and simply tell a story that is macabre, unsettling, and strangely sweet. To be sure, this is a very good film, and after finishing it, I couldn't help but wonder what else Scott might have in him. Even those who find themselves turned off by his post "The Hunger" oeuvre should find themselves pleasantly surprised by this truly wonderful film."

References

External links

1970 films
Films directed by Tony Scott
British black-and-white films
1970s English-language films